Ruth is an unincorporated community in Marshall County, Alabama, United States. A post office operated under the name Ruth from 1891 to 1904.

References

Unincorporated communities in Marshall County, Alabama
Unincorporated communities in Alabama